Selim Dilli (born 26 May 1998) is a Turkish footballer who plays as a midfielder for Kasımpaşa.

Professional career
Dilli is a youth product of Trabzonspor, and began his senior career with Çorum in the TFF Third League from 2016 until 2018. On 28 June 2022, he transferred to the Süper Lig club Kasımpaşa. He had a brief stint with Fatsa Belediyespor in the 2018–19 season. From 2019 to January 2021, he moved to Uşakspor in the TFF Second League. He shortly signed with Konyaspor and immediately went on loan with 1922 Konyaspor for the second half of the 2022–23 season. He moved to Hopaspor for the 2021–22 season, and after a strong performance signed with Kasımpaşa for the 2022–23 season in the Süper Lig. He made his professional debut with Kasımpaşa as a substitute in a 5–1 Süper Lig win over Giresunspor on 1 February 2023.

International career
Dilli represented the Turkey U23s in their winning campaign at the 2021 Islamic Solidarity Games.

Honours
Turkey U23
Islamic Solidarity Games: 2021

References

External links
 
 

1998 births
Living people
People from Trabzon Province
Turkish footballers
Turkey youth international footballers
Uşakspor footballers
Konyaspor footballers
Kasımpaşa S.K. footballers
Süper Lig players
TFF Second League players
TFF Third League players
Association football midfielders